Trimerotropis agrestis, known generally as the toothed dune grasshopper or toothed field grasshopper, is a species of band-winged grasshopper in the family Acrididae. It is found in North America.

Subspecies
These two subspecies belong to the species Trimerotropis agrestis:
 Trimerotropis agrestis agrestis
 Trimerotropis agrestis barnumi

References

Oedipodinae
Articles created by Qbugbot
Insects described in 1900